John Friedrich is the name of:

 John Friedrich (actor) (born 1958), American film actor
 John Friedrich (fraudster) (1950–1991), conman who worked Australia
 John Friedrich (luthier) (born 1858), German-born violin maker who worked in the United States

See also
 Johannes Friedrich (disambiguation)
 John Frederick (disambiguation)